Francisco Fortunato Pires (born 24 November 1948) is a São Toméan politician. He was President of the country's National Assembly from November 16, 1994 to April 18, 2002.  He was born in the hamlet of Canga, today a neighborhood of Cruzeiro not far from Trindade.  He was also Minister of Justice in the 1980s.

After independence, he attended at the University of Lisbon in 1981 and the University of Havana in 1987. He became Minister of Justice from 1985 to 1991. From 1981 to 1993, he was also Santomean ambassador to Portrugal.

He represented MLSTP-PSD for the district of Cantagalo, a party he campaigned from 1974 to the legislative elections in 1980. After independence he represented Mé-Zochi in the legislative elections in 1985, 1994 and in 1998. Between 1994 and 2002, he was president of the Santomean National Assembly. He succeeded Leonel Mário d'Alva and was succeeded by Dionísio Tomé Dias. Running as an independent candidate in the 29 July 2001 presidential election, Pires finished last out of five candidates, winning 0.71% of the vote. In 2003, he became judge of the Court of Auditors, a position he held until he retired in 2011, later in the year, he was nominated as member of Superior Council of Judicial Magistracy.

References

1948 births
Living people
Presidents of the National Assembly (São Tomé and Príncipe)
Ambassadors of São Tomé and Príncipe to Portugal
Movement for the Liberation of São Tomé and Príncipe/Social Democratic Party politicians
People from Mé-Zóchi District